Mirkhel is a village and railway station in Parbhani taluka of Parbhani district in the Indian state of Maharashtra.

Demography
As per 2011 census, Mirkhel has total 435 families residing. Village has population of 2,283 of which 1,166 were males while 1,117 were females.
Average Sex Ratio of village is 958 which is higher than Maharashtra state average of 929.
Literacy rate of village was 77% compared to 82.3% of Maharashtra. Male literacy rate was 85% while female literacy rate was 68%.
Schedule Caste (SC) constitutes 26% of total population.

Mirkhel Railway Station

Geography and transport
Following table shows distance of Mirkhel from some of major cities.

References

Villages in Parbhani district